The Tibere was a French experimental rocket for atmospheric reentry tests. The three-stage Tibere was started to 23.2.1971 and to 18.3.1972 by Biscarosse within the framework of the program ELECTRE. Here flight altitudes were reached by 159 kilometers. The first stage of the Tibere had similarly as the first stage of the Berenice 4 stabilization rockets. The Tibere possessed a takeoff thrust of 170 kN, a startmass of 4500 kg, a diameter of 0,56 m and a length of 14,50 m.

External links
Article title

Rocketry